Wolf Creek is a stream in Mineral County, Colorado. It is the creek for which Wolf Creek Pass is named.

Sources

The creek rises just to the west of the Wolf Creek ski area at the Continental Divide near the top of Wolf Creek Pass. From there it flows west, paralleling U.S. Highway 160 for several miles until it passes under the highway on its way to its confluence with the West Fork of the San Juan River near the bottom of the pass.

See also
List of rivers of Colorado
List of tributaries of the Colorado River

References

Rivers of Colorado
Rivers of Mineral County, Colorado
Tributaries of the Colorado River in Colorado